This is a list of Telugu-language films produced in the Telugu cinema in India that are released/scheduled to be released in the year 2021.

Box office collection 
The list of highest-grossing Telugu films released in 2021, by worldwide box office gross revenue, are as follows:

January – March

April – June

July – September

October – December

Notes

References

External links 

2021
Telugu
Telugu
2020s in Indian cinema